Kakutani is a Japanese surname. Notable people with the surname include:

 Michiko Kakutani (born 1955), Japanese-American Pulitzer Prize-winning critic
 Shizuo Kakutani (1911–2004), Japanese-American mathematician
Kakutani fixed-point theorem

Japanese-language surnames